China–Brazil Earth Resources Satellite 2 (CBERS-2), also known as Ziyuan I-02 or Ziyuan 1B, was a remote sensing satellite operated as part of the China–Brazil Earth Resources Satellite program between the Chinese Center for Resources Satellite Data and Application and Brazilian National Institute for Space Research. The second CBERS satellite to fly, it was launched by China in 2003 to replace CBERS-1.

CBERS-2 was a  spacecraft built by the China Academy of Space Technology and based on the Phoenix-Eye 1 satellite bus. The spacecraft was powered by a single solar array, which provided 1,100 watts of electricity for the satellite's systems.

A Chang Zheng 4B carrier rocket, operated by the China Academy of Launch Vehicle Technology, was used to launch CBERS-2. The launch took place at 03:16 UTC on 21 October 2003, using Launch Complex 7 at the Taiyuan Satellite Launch Center. The satellite was successfully placed into a sun-synchronous orbit.

Following the launch of CBERS-2B in 2007, CBERS-2 was retired from service.

References

Spacecraft launched in 2003
China–Brazil Earth Resources Satellite program
Earth observation satellites of Brazil
Satellites of China
2003 in China
Spacecraft launched by Long March rockets